The Marksmanship Medal is a United States Navy and the U.S. Coast Guard military award and is the highest award one may receive for weapons qualification.  The Marksmanship Medal is the equivalent of the Expert Marksmanship Badge in the U.S. Army and U.S. Marine Corps. Additionally, select State National Guard organizations award marksmanship medals to guardsmen who achieve some of the highest aggregate scores at state-level marksmanship competitions.

The Marksmanship Medal is awarded for qualifying as an expert marksman on either the 9×19mm Beretta M9 (Navy or Coast Guard), .40 S&W SIG P229 DAK (Coast Guard only), or M16 rifle.  To qualify at the expert level, a superior score must be obtained on an approved weapons qualification course.  The standard Navy weapons qualification course for pistol normally consists of several courses of fire from strong-side supported (standing), weak-side supported (standing), and strong-side supported (kneeling) positions.  For the rifle, the Navy qualification course consists of firing from a sitting and prone positions.

Those qualifying as an expert marksman are authorized to wear the Marksmanship Medal, awarded as two separate decorations for rifle or pistol qualifications.  Those having qualified on both pistol and rifle may receive both medals for simultaneous wear.  The Marksmanship Medal is worn as a full-sized medal on dress uniforms.  On a duty uniform all successful qualifiers may wear the award as the standard Marksmanship Ribbon. Those qualifying as an expert are authorized to wear the Expert device on the ribbon and those qualifying as a sharpshooter are authorized a "S" device (Navy-bronze and Coast Guard-silver) for that ribbon.

The Navy Marksmanship Medals were first issued in 1969.

Similarly, the Alaska Department of Military and Veterans Affairs awards the Alaska Adjutant General's Marksmanship Proficiency Medals, one for rifle and one for pistol, to the top ten guardsman with the highest aggregate scores at the Alaska National Guard Adjutant General’s Match.  The winners of these awards are selected to join the state's marksmanship team to represent the Alaska National Guard at the Winston P. Wilson Rifle and Pistol Championships for a chance to win the Chief's Fifty Marksmanship Badge.  A red, white, and blue ribbon is used to represent both medals; however the actual rifle and pistol medals suspended by this ribbon are distinct.

See also
Marksmanship Device
Marksmanship Badge (United States)
Awards and decorations of the United States military

References

Awards and decorations of the United States Navy
Awards and decorations of the United States Coast Guard
Awards established in 1969